Tropical Storm Harvey was a moderately strong tropical storm that caused flooding across south Florida during the 1999 Atlantic hurricane season. The tenth tropical cyclone and eighth named storm of the season, Harvey developed from a tropical wave in the Gulf of Mexico on September 19. After forming, the system gradually intensified and became a tropical storm early on September 20. Throughout the rest of its duration, Harvey slowly intensified as it headed eastward. Late on September 21, Harvey made landfall in Southwest Florida with winds of 60 mph (95 km/h). Harvey emerged into the Atlantic early on September 22, but was absorbed by an extratropical cyclone. The remnants of Harvey reached Atlantic Canada before dissipating.

Harvey caused minor flooding in south Florida because of light to relatively heavy rainfall in that portion of the state and at least 34 houses and businesses in southern Florida were flooded. There were sporadic reports of tropical storm-force winds throughout the state, as well as two tornadoes. Damage estimates in Florida reached about $15 million (1999 USD). Throughout the rest of the United States, impact was limited, confined to light rainfall in Georgia, North Carolina and South Carolina. Heavy rainfall was reported in Atlantic Canada and Harvey became the wettest tropical cyclone on record in that country. Significant flooding, especially to roads and houses, was reported due to the heavy rainfall and damage throughout Atlantic Canada totalled several million dollars.

Meteorological history

A tropical wave first emerged from the west coast of Africa on late on September 4, 1999 and entered the Atlantic Ocean. The system trekked westward uneventfully and was unable to organize itself due to the influence of outflow from Hurricane Floyd. After Floyd moved northward, however, the system began developing convection as it traversed the Caribbean Sea. By September 16 the disturbance transitioned into a broad area of low pressure while tracking northwestward in the western Caribbean Sea. After two days the low had continued to intensify as it entered the southern Gulf of Mexico. The National Hurricane Center initiated advisories on the depression approximately four hours later.

Upon its designation the depression was still relatively weak and disorganized and, due to a number of factors, further strengthening was expected to be gradual. Outflow over the cyclone improved throughout the day on September 19, however, as it drifted northward. At 0000 UTC on September 20 the depression was upgraded to the eighth named storm of the season, Tropical Storm Harvey, based on surface observations and reports from the Hurricane Hunters. Shortly thereafter the storm became nearly stationary while slowly beginning to turn eastward. Harvey remained disorganized due to persistent wind shear. Despite the strong wind shear, the cyclone managed to reach its peak intensity with maximum sustained winds of 60 mph (95 km/h) and a minimum barometric pressure of 994 mbar (hPa; 29.35 inHg) late on September 20.

By the early on September 21 Harvey accelerated slightly and turned southeastward. Although the center of the storm was poorly defined at the time and located to the northwest of the main area of thunderstorm activity, convection was strong in nature. Later that day the storm curved towards the east while approaching Florida. At around 1700 UTC on September 21 Harvey made landfall near Everglades City, Florida with sustained winds of 60 mph (95 km/h). The storm further accelerated across the Florida Peninsula and quickly merged with a developing storm off the coast of South Carolina at 0600 UTC on September 22. Although the remnants of Harvey became unidentifiable later that day, Environment Canada reported that the system crossed Newfoundland before dissipating on September 24.

Preparations
Early on September 19 a tropical storm watch was issued for the west coast of Florida from Bonita Beach to the mouth of the Suwannee River, which was upgraded to a tropical storm warning and hurricane watch the next day. Tropical storm watches were posted for the state's Atlantic coast north of Jupiter Inlet to near Flagler Beach. A tropical storm watch, and later a warning, was issued for the northwestern Bahamas. The advisories were amended several times before being discontinued on September 20 through September 21.

In advance of the storm, public schools and many private schools closed, Although no mandatory evacuations were ordered, multiple shelters were opened in schools and churches and government offices shut down in anticipation of Harvey's onslaught. Several counties issued a state of emergency. Residents prepared individually by, for example, securing boats and lawn furniture. Free sand and sandbags were made available to the general public and inmates filled bags for those physically unable to do so themselves. Officials at Lake Manatee began lowering the water level to help avoid flooding. In Hillsborough County the threat of the storm forced the cancellation of local football programs.

Impact

Florida
Tropical Storm Harvey dropped moderate to heavy rainfall throughout much of Florida, although the highest amounts were concentrated near its landfall location. The  of rain in southern Lee County caused minor flooding in homes and businesses in lowly-lying areas, mostly along U.S. Route 41 between Estero and Bonita Springs.

Some tidal flooding occurred at Everglades City, where a runway at the county airport was inundated. Throughout Collier County, coastal flooding caused major street flooding and water entered 34 homes and buildings, as well as six cars. Minor coastal flooding was reported elsewhere, including along the Florida Keys; part of State Road A1A was closed as a result. The surge combined with increased wave action to produce light beach erosion along the coast and in Everglades National Park.

The storm also spawned two tornadoes, in Collier and Miami-Dade counties, one of which tore the roof off a house. Strong winds in the Florida Keys downed a few trees, but minimal damage occurred otherwise. Overall, damage in Florida totaled to approximately $15 million (1999 USD; $  USD).

Canada

Nova Scotia
In Nova Scotia the remnants of Harvey dropped torrential amounts of rainfall, peaking at 11.89 inches (302 mm) in Oxford. As a result, the system is, as of 2018, ranked as the wettest known tropical cyclone (or remnants) in Canada. Throughout the province there was widespread flooding, countless road closures, and numerous flooded basements. Most notably, a portion of Trans-Canada Highway and Highway 103 was inundated by water. Another major road was closed in Wolfville after Gaspereau River overflowed. Additionally, a bridge collapsed near Collingwood. In Oxford alone, damage to roads cost at least $3 million (1999 CAD) to repair.

Flooding damage was also reported to infrastructure other than roads. After two rivers overflowed, at least 70% of Oxford was flooded, which included a hardware store and dozens of homes, while a senior citizens living complex were evacuated. The SOS Children's Village in Margaretsville sustained approximately $25,000 (1999 CAD) in flood damage. Schools in Amherst and the University of Windsor canceled afternoon classes on September 24. In the Canning area, 1,500 people were left without power, while electricity was also lost in Annapolis Valley, Yarmouth, Truro, Westville, Amherst, and Stellarton. A woman required rescue by firemen after her van plunged into the swollen River Philip. In Maccan, a tractor trailer loaded with lumber went off the road. Damage in Nova Scotia likely exceeded $5 million (1999 CAD).

New Brunswick
In New Brunswick, flooding also occurred throughout the province. As a result, three roads were flooded in Saint John, three other streets were closed in Moncton, and one street each was inundated by water in Fox Creek and Riverview. In addition, the causeway connecting Moncton and Riverview was closed due to flood waters. In Dieppe a local state of emergency was declared because of the numerous washed out roads. Along Route 16 travelers rescued four senior citizens from their car, which soon sank into a ditch. Train service by Via Rail was temporarily suspended after the tracks were washed out near Memramcook. Damage in the province of New Brunswick came to several million dollars, most of it in Moncton.

Elsewhere in Canada
At another location, Charlottetown, precipitation totals only reached . Although potato fields were inundated by water, minimal damage occurred to that crop. In Summerside at least five roads were closed due to flooding and water entered the mechanical room via the telephone and electrical conduit at the local intermediate school. Road infrastructure was also affected, such as in Howlan, where a bridge slightly longer than  washed away. Restrictions were imposed on the use of the Confederation Bridge during the height of the storm. Adverse conditions also prevented the Northumberland Ferry from docking in Prince Edward Island, causing it to return to Nova Scotia.

As rainfall in Newfoundland peaked at only , damage in the province was mostly from strong winds. Strong winds left 4,500 people without electricity in St. John's and the Burin Peninsula, knocked down traffic lights in St. John's, and snapped and uprooted trees throughout the province.

Elsewhere
The Tropicale, then owned by Carnival Cruise Lines, was left disabled after a fire on board shut down the vessel's engines. The ship encountered  seas in the Gulf of Mexico before restarting one of its engines and taking a path around the storm, having initially planned to return to Tampa. The ship provided meteorological reports from the storm that were used to evaluate its winds. In the Bahamas Harvey caused flooding in low-lying areas of three islands.

See also

 List of Canada hurricanes
 List of Florida hurricanes (1975–1999)
 List of North Carolina hurricanes (1980–1999)
 Other storms of the same name

References

External links

 National Hurricane Center Preliminary Report on Tropical Storm Harvey

Harvey
Harvey (1999)
1999 natural disasters in the United States
Harvey (1999)
Harvey (1999)
Harvey (1999)
Harvey (1999)
1999 in Florida
1999 in North Carolina